Bou Omrane  is a town in central Tunisia in Gafsa Governorate.

See also
Culture of Tunisia

Populated places in Tunisia
Communes of Tunisia